Go Cat Go! is an album by the American musician Carl Perkins, released in 1996. For most of the songs, Perkins performs with other artists. The album includes recordings from all four ex-Beatles, with Paul McCartney, George Harrison and Ringo Starr recording new material, while John Lennon's version of "Blue Suede Shoes" comes from his album Live Peace in Toronto 1969. Jimi Hendrix's version of the same song is also an archive recording.

The album was produced by Bob Johnston. Also performing with Perkins on the album are Tom Petty & the Heartbreakers, Johnny Cash, Willie Nelson, Bono, Paul Simon, and John Fogerty.

Critical reception

AllMusic wrote that Perkins sings and plays "in a most masterful and rockin' way."

Track listing
 "All Mama's Children" (Carl Perkins & John Fogerty)
 "One More Shot" (Carl Perkins & Tom Petty and the Heartbreakers)
 "Rockabilly Music" (Carl Perkins & Paul Simon)
 "Distance Makes No Difference with Love" (Carl Perkins & George Harrison)
 "Give Me Back My Job" (Carl Perkins, Bono, Johnny Cash, Willie Nelson & Tom Petty)
 "Blue Suede Shoes" (The Jimi Hendrix Experience)
 "Quarter Horse" (Carl Perkins)
 "Don't Stop the Music" (Carl Perkins)
 "Matchbox" (Carl Perkins & Willie Nelson)
 "Go Cat Go" (Carl Perkins)
 "Two Old Army Pals" (Carl Perkins & Johnny Cash)
 "Honey Don't" (Carl Perkins & Ringo Starr)
 "Wild Texas Wind" (Carl Perkins & Willie Nelson)
 "Restless" (Carl Perkins & Tom Petty and the Heartbreakers)
 "A Mile Out of Memphis" (Carl Perkins & Paul Simon)
 "My Old Friend" (Carl Perkins & Paul McCartney)
 "Blue Suede Shoes" (John Lennon)

References

1996 albums
Carl Perkins albums
albums produced by Bob Johnston
Albums recorded at FPSHOT
Tribute albums